Cho Chi-hyo (born December 6, 1970 in Incheon, South Korea) is a South Korean former handball player.

Cho was a runner-up for top goal scorer (45 goals in 6 games) at the 1992 Summer Olympics held in Barcelona, Spain, where the South Korea men's national handball team finished in the 6th place. He was eventually named to the All-Star Team of the competition.

After winning a gold medal at the 1994 Asian Games in Hiroshima, Japan, he moved to the Swiss Handball League in October 1994. For 13 years in Switzerland, he led his teams to the league champions eight times, winning two scoring titles and one league MVP.

In 2007, Cho moved to Germany to play for HBW Balingen-Weilstetten in the Handball-Bundesliga. In 2008, he was selected for the South Korea men's national handball team at the age of 38, and led his team to the quarterfinals of the 2008 Summer Olympics in Beijing, China.

References

External links

1970 births
Living people
Olympic handball players of South Korea
Handball players at the 1992 Summer Olympics
Handball players at the 2000 Summer Olympics
Handball players at the 2008 Summer Olympics
South Korean expatriate sportspeople in Germany
South Korean expatriate sportspeople in Switzerland
South Korean handball coaches
South Korean male handball players
Expatriate handball players
Asian Games medalists in handball
Handball players at the 1990 Asian Games
Handball players at the 1994 Asian Games
Asian Games gold medalists for South Korea
Sportspeople from Incheon
Medalists at the 1994 Asian Games
Medalists at the 1990 Asian Games
20th-century South Korean people